Chennai Super Kings were one of the ten teams that took part in the 2011 Indian Premier League. They were captained for the fourth season in succession by Indian skipper Mahendra Singh Dhoni. The Super Kings had won  both 2010 Indian Premier League and 2010 Champions League Twenty20 under Dhoni's captaincy.

The Super Kings completed a hat-trick of titles by winning the 2011 Indian Premier League. Thus, they became the first team in the history of IPL to successfully defend their title. They also won all the matches held at their home ground in Chennai that season and created a new record of becoming the first IPL team to win all of its home games. With this, they earned a direct qualification for the main event of 2011 Champions League Twenty20 where they could not replicate similar consistency before crashing out of the event in the group stages.

Background
Chennai had a highly successful 2010 season where they emerged victorious in both Indian Premier League as well as Champions League Twenty20. However, with the addition of two more teams in the IPL for the 2011 season, it was declared by the IPL Governing Council that each franchise can retain a maximum of four players of their squad for the 2011 season, only three of whom can be Indian players, and the rest of the international players would be put in the mega-auction. The spending power for each franchise at the mega-auction was restricted to $9 million. The player retention clause also stated that if a franchise decides to retain four players, $4.5 million will be charged, leaving the franchise with only $4.5 million to spend at the auction.

The Chennai franchise, keen to have the same set of core players, decided to retain the maximum number of players through the retention process. CSK retained captain MS Dhoni, vice-captain Suresh Raina, Murali Vijay and Albie Morkel for a total of $4.5 million. This left them with the power of spending only $4.5 million at the mega-auction. At the mega-auction which was held on 8 and 9 January 2011 in Bangalore, the Chennai franchise could successfully bid for 14 players, eight of whom were part of their 2010 squad.

Chennai Super Kings also managed to get back three domestic players who had been a part of their team in the first three years in Shadab Jakati, Anirudha Srikkanth and Abhinav Mukund. Apart from these three, they also signed contracts with Tamil Nadu players Yo Mahesh, K. Vasudevadas and Ganapathi Vignesh.

Before the start of the IPL season, CSK signed up New Zealand pacer Tim Southee as a replacement to Ben Hilfenhaus who was ruled out of the tournament due to an injury. They also appointed former Australian fast bowler Andy Bichel as their bowling coach, replacing Venkatesh Prasad who moved to the newly formed Kochi Tuskers Kerala franchise. Bichel had previously worked as Kolkata Knight Riders' bowling coach in 2009 before getting sacked after the team's disastrous season.

List of players bought at the auction

Squad
Players with international caps before the start of the 2011 IPL season are listed in bold.

Indian Premier League

The Super Kings started their IPL 2011 campaign with a two-run win against the Kolkata Knight Riders in Chennai. Opener Anirudha Srikkanth won the Man of the match for scoring 64. But the Super Kings lost their second game of the season to the Kings XI Punjab, despite setting KXIP a target of 189, after Punjab's Paul Valthaty hit the first century of the season (an unbeaten 62-ball 120). Michael Hussey's 83* took them to a comfortable win over the Royal Challengers Bangalore before a defeat at the hands of the Kochi Tuskers Kerala in a rain-affected match at the latter's home ground. This match was followed by another close match against Mumbai Indians, which the Super Kings lost by 8 runs. Mumbai's spinner Harbhajan Singh achieved his career-best T20 figures of 5/18 in 4 overs during the match. However, in their next match at home against Pune Warriors India, Michael Hussey scored a half-century and the bowlers bowled economically to defend a total of 142. Two days later, against the same team in an away match, a spell of 3/21 by the Man of the match Doug Bollinger and a match-winning partnership between Subramaniam Badrinath and Suresh Raina saw the Super Kings complete a double over the Pune team. Against the Deccan Chargers, they registered their third straight win thanks to the all-round effort of Albie Morkel who took three wickets and then scored 19 from just 6 deliveries. Bollinger and Jakati also picked up two wickets each and bowled economically which helped them to overcome a quickfire half-century from the Chargers' opener Sunny Sohal. They secured their fifth straight home victory in their next match against the Rajasthan Royals. Chasing a modest target of 148, Hussey, who struck 79* off just 55 balls, and Raina, 61* off 51 balls, put on an unbeaten century partnership to take Chennai to a comfortable eight-wicket win. This was followed by a defeat to the Kolkata Knight Riders in a rain-affected match at the Eden Gardens. A couple of days later, their batting came good in an away game against the Rajasthan Royals at Jaipur, where all the top-four batsmen scored 40-plus runs helping them win by 63 runs. The Chennai Super Kings extended their unbeaten home record by defeating the Delhi Daredevils and moving to the top of the table. MS Dhoni won the Man of the match for his knock of 63* (31), which was supported by Badrinath who also struck a half-century. The Super Kings played their last home game against the Kochi Tuskers Kerala and won it by eleven runs. Wriddhiman Saha top-scored for CSK with a resilient 46*. With this win, they created a new record of becoming the first team to win all their home matches in the history of the Indian Premier League. They faced the toppers of the points table, Royal Challengers Bangalore in their final league game at Bangalore. Dhoni's innings of 70* (40) was responsible for Chennai's total of 128/8 which was chased down with ease by the home side with Chris Gayle scoring an unbeaten half-century. The Super Kings finished second on the league table with 18 points from 14 matches as they had a better net run rate than the Mumbai Indians who also had the same number of points.

The Chennai team faced the table-toppers Royal Challengers in the first Qualifier at the Wankhede Stadium in Mumbai. Dhoni, who won the toss, asked RCB to bat first. RCB lost Chris Gayle early but managed to put on 175 on board riding on an unbeaten 70 by Virat Kohli. Chennai's run-chase got off to a disastrous start as both the openers were dismissed within the second over. But then, Suresh Raina put on crucial fifty-run partnerships with Badrinath and Dhoni, taking CSK closer to the target. But after the dismissal of Dhoni, 45 was required from 20 deliveries and a victory seemed improbable. Then Albie Morkel hit 28* from just 10 deliveries which took the Super Kings to a six-wicket win with two balls to spare. Raina won the Man of the match for his unbeaten 73. The win took them to the finals which was to be played at their home ground. This was the third time in four seasons that they had entered the finals of the IPL. They met the same team, Royal Challengers Bangalore at the final, after RCB defeated the Mumbai Indians in the second Qualifier. CSK won the toss once again, this time elected to bat first. They got off to a brisk start as openers Michael Hussey and Murali Vijay shared a record first-wicket partnership of 159 runs before Hussey got out for 63. Vijay continued his big hitting and struck four fours and six sixes in his innings of 95. Chennai ended their 20 overs on 202/5, which was the highest total at the venue in that season. R Ashwin struck in the very first over of the RCB innings, removing Gayle for a duck. The Super Kings bowlers kept picking up wickets regularly in the innings and eventually won the game by 63 runs and were crowned champions for the second time in succession. Murali Vijay was declared the Man of the Match for his match-winning innings.

Thus, the 2011 season ended up as Chennai's most successful season because, not only did they successfully defend the title, but also assert their dominance in the league with a win percentage of 64.11, their highest in four seasons. They maintained an absolute home record in the season and became the first team to win the tournament at home. They also won the Fairplay Award for the third time in four years.

Season standings

Match log

Most runs

Most wickets

Champions League Twenty20
After finishing as the 2011 Indian Premier League champions, the team qualified for the 2011 Champions League Twenty20. They had previously qualified for the 2008 Season which was subsequently cancelled and also the 2010 Season which they went on to become the Champions.

Starting as the defending champions, the Super Kings faced IPL rivals Mumbai Indians in their first game. Mumbai won the close match mainly due to Lasith Malinga's batting performances towards the end. Chennai were involved in another close match and ended up victorious against the South African side of Cape Cobras with a man of the match performance from Dwayne Bravo. However Chennai's lost their next match to Trinidad and Tobago. CSK then faced the 2009 champions NSW Blues in a must-win encounter. CSK were eliminated after a decisive win for the visitors who were led by a hundred from David Warner.

In the end, Chennai finished at the bottom of the Group with just 2 points while IPL counterparts Mumbai Indians and NSW Blues proceeded to the knockout phase.

Season standings

Match log

Most runs

Most wickets

References

Chennai Super Kings seasons
2011 Indian Premier League